Keith Freeman (born December 11, 1963) is an assistant coach of the women's basketball team at Mississippi State University. He is the former women's basketball program head coach at Valparaiso University. Freeman, the sixth head coach in the history of the Valparaiso University Crusader women’s basketball program, was hired as the head coach before the 1994–1995 season. Freeman also served as the head women's basketball coach at Saint Joseph's College in Rensselaer, Indiana, from 1990–1994, and was the Great Lakes Valley Coach of the Year in 1992. Prior his tenure at Saint Joseph's, Freeman was the head men's basketball coach at Huntington (Ind.) College from 1985 to 1989. Freeman took over the Huntington program at age 21, making him one of the youngest college coaches in the nation.  Freeman began coaching at the age of 19 when he was named the head women's basketball coach at Huntington, serving from 1983 to 1985.

Freeman graduated cum laude from Huntington College in May 1986, earning a Bachelor of Science degree in business administration. He also completed his Master of Business Administration at Ball State University in August 1987.

Head coaching record

Women's basketball
Source

Men's basketball

References

External links
 Mississippi State coaching bio

1963 births
Living people
American men's basketball players
American women's basketball coaches
Ball State University alumni 
Huntington University (United States) alumni
Mississippi State Bulldogs women's basketball coaches
Old Dominion Monarchs women's basketball coaches
People from Huntington, Indiana
People from Rensselaer, Indiana
Place of birth missing (living people)
Valparaiso Beacons women's basketball coaches
Wright State Raiders women's basketball coaches